Ramanarayanam is the  temple Located on Korukonda Road in Vizianagaram, India. which is 45 km from Visakhapatnam

History
The temple was constructed by NCS Charitable Trust over 15 acres area based on Ramayana and temple which is designed like a Bow and arrow shape. The temple has become a major tourism hub for the Uttarandhra region. It has become one of the most visited places in Vizianagaram after its establishment within 18 months, with the temple attracting over 2.4 million tourists.

Transport
The temple is well connected with Vizianagaram and Visakhapatnam, Visakhapatnam Airport is 50km distance and upcoming green field Bhogapuram Airport is 15 km.

See also

Vaishnavism

References

External links
 

Hindu temples in Vizianagaram district
Rama temples